Robert A. Bowman served for 17 years as President/CEO of MLB Advanced Media ("MLBAM"). Media reports in late 2017 alleged his departure from the MLBAM resulted from a decade of inappropriate behavior, ranging from multiple consensual intimate relationships with subordinates and leading a "culture of partying and heavy drinking with employees outside the office."   MLBAM manages online activities for Major League Baseball including the MLBAM@Bat video streaming applications for Smartphones, pad computing devices and the like. 
From 1995–2000, he was ITT's President/Chief Operating Officer. From 1991–95, he was also ITT's CFO.

From 1983–90, Bowman was Michigan's State Treasurer and was widely credited with helping fuel the state's economic recovery, including from a 1987 Public Sector Consultants' profile that "Wall Street smiled on Michigan's improved fiscal
condition," leading to national notoriety for Bowman.  In 2010 it was reported that he was considering a run for governor of Michigan.

Education
Bowman graduated from Harvard College in 1977 and the Wharton School of Business in 1979.

MLBAM At Bat App
Bowman was instrumental in spearheading the development of MLB's At Bat app for the iPhone, iPad, Android, Kindle, etc.

Bowman Patents
Bowman is named as a co-inventor on the following U.S. Patents:
U.S. Patent No. 8,121,872: System and Method for Allocating Seats for a Ticketed Event

U.S. Patent No. 8,121,712: System and Method for Determining an Offensive, Defensive, and Cumulative Efficiency of a Sports Team

U.S. Patent No. 8,045,956: System and Method for Venue-to-Venue Messaging

References

American technology chief executives
Living people
State treasurers of Michigan
Harvard College alumni
American chief operating officers
American chief financial officers
Wharton School of the University of Pennsylvania alumni
Year of birth missing (living people)